Huntington is a station on the Port Jefferson Branch of the Long Island Rail Road. It is located near New York Avenue (NY 110), connecting it to Melville, the Long Island Expressway and Huntington and Broadway in Huntington Station, New York.

History

Huntington station opened on January 13, 1868, amidst a great deal of controversy between the people of Huntington and Oliver Charlick over the right-of-way and station location which the people wanted directly within Huntington Village, specifically at Main Street and New York Avenue.

Throughout much of the 20th century, the station served as a hub. One reason for this was that it also served as the southern terminus of the Huntington Trolley Spur between 1890 and 1909. The trolley was electrified on June 17, 1898, and extended towards Melville, Farmingdale, and Amityville in 1909.  The trolley ran between Halesite and Amityville until 1919, and was replaced in 1920 by another trolley which only ran as far south as Jericho Turnpike until 1927.

The grade crossing at New York Avenue was eliminated between 1908 and 1909, which also required the relocation of the original station building, which was located south of the present structure. The current station building was built in 1909 and was renovated by the Long Island Rail Road for its centennial.

On October 19, 1970, a project to electrify the Port Jefferson Branch up to Huntington was completed, following the completion of a project to install high-level platforms at the station. The station also became a transfer point for diesel trains serving the non-electrified portion of the branch, requiring most passengers traveling to and from points east to change at Huntington.

The first parking garage was constructed on the south side of the station in the 1980s. The following decade, Huntington Station saw major reconstruction that included the addition of handicap-accessible ramps, a second parking garage on the north side of the station, a second pedestrian bridge across both tracks, and a pedestrian bridge across New York Avenue.
 
The station currently has a total of 5,040 parking spaces, including 3,500 spaces in two garages on opposite sides of the tracks. The north garage will be renovated in 2010 using $1 million of Federal Stimulus funding.

Transit-oriented development
As one of the busiest stations on the LIRR, Huntington is a prime target for transit-oriented development. Avalon Huntington Station, which occupies a nearby lot southeast of the station and contains several hundred residential units in a walkable, mixed-use development, was opened in 2014.

Station layout
The station has two high-level side platforms, each 12 cars long. Both through trains and terminating trains use either platform, with designations noted in the branch timetable. Transfers between diesel and electric trains are generally made on the same platform, with a five-to-ten minute buffer in between the arrival of an electric train and departure of a diesel train (or vice versa).

East of the station is a 24-car-long storage siding. The LIRR had plans to build an electric equipment maintenance facility there, but the project was canceled due to community opposition.

The station boasts a series of 19 stained glass panels that can be viewed from the platform. They were created as part of the Metropolitan Transportation Authority's Arts for Transit program by artist Joe Zucker, who is from East Hampton. The panels are called For My Grandfather Noye Pride, a Locomotive Engineer, and make up a 115-foot depiction of a flatbed train carrying items familiar to Long Island including lobsters, whales, ducks and boats. The panels were created using 8,000 pieces of glass.

References

External links

Huntington Traction Company; 1920-1927(Arrt's Arrchive)
Former Coal Warehouse near Huntington Station (TrainsAreFun)
 HUNT Interlocking (The LIRR Today)
 New York Avenue entrance from Google Maps Street View

Long Island Rail Road stations in Suffolk County, New York
Huntington, New York
Railway stations in the United States opened in 1868
1868 establishments in New York (state)